Adam Leonard (born November 4, 1986) is a former professional gridiron football linebacker. He most recently played for the BC Lions of the Canadian Football League. Leonard signed as a free agent with the Lions on July 20, 2010. He played college football for the Hawaii Warriors.He is a high school teacher at John Glenn high school in Norwalk California.

References

External links
BC Lions bio

1986 births
Living people
African-American players of Canadian football
American players of Canadian football
BC Lions players
Canadian football linebackers
Players of Canadian football from Seattle
Seattle Seahawks players
21st-century African-American sportspeople
20th-century African-American people
Players of American football from Seattle
Hawaii Rainbow Warriors football players